Johannes Christoffel Pretorius (born ) is a South African rugby sevens player for the South Africa national team and a rugby union player for the s. His regular position is flanker.

Biography 
He was named in the ' wider training squad prior to the 2019 Super Rugby season, but was also included in the South Africa national sevens squad prior to the 2018–19 World Rugby Sevens Series.

In January 2019, Pretorius was named the Blitzboks' travelling reserve for the Hamilton Sevens, and a week later, he was included in the main squad for the Sydney event.

In 2022, He was part of the South African team that won their second Commonwealth Games gold medal in Birmingham.

References

South African rugby union players
Living people
1998 births
People from Govan Mbeki Local Municipality
Rugby union flankers
South Africa international rugby sevens players
Rugby sevens players at the 2020 Summer Olympics
Olympic rugby sevens players of South Africa
Rugby sevens players at the 2022 Commonwealth Games
Commonwealth Games gold medallists for South Africa
Commonwealth Games medallists in rugby sevens
Lions (United Rugby Championship) players
Medallists at the 2022 Commonwealth Games